Nohely Coromoto González Arteaga (born December 5, 1963) is a Venezuelan actress recognized internationally for her starring roles in telenovelas during the 1980s and 1990s.

Filmography

Telenovelas
 María Laura (1983) - RCTV
 Chao, Cristina (1983) - RCTV
 La Salvaje (1983) - RCTV
 Leonela (1983 - 1984) - RCTV
 Azucena (1984) - RCTV
 Topacio (1984 - 1985) - RCTV
 Atrévete (1986) - RCTV
 Tu mundo y el mío (1987) - Crustel S.A. (Argentina)
 Alma mía (1989) - RCTV
 Emperatriz (1990) - Marte Televisión
 La traidora (1991) - Marte Televisión (first Spanish telenovela aired in the Philippines)
 Las dos Dianas (1992) - Marte Televisión
 Pedacito de Cielo (1993) - Marte Televisión 
 El paseo de la gracia de Dios (1993) - Marte Televisión
 Cruz de nadie (1994) - Marte Televisión
 Samantha (1998) - Venevisión
 El país de las mujeres (1998) - Venevisión
 Amantes de Luna llena (2000) - Venevisión
 Guerra de mujeres (2001) - Venevisión
 Las González (2002) - Venevisión
 Cosita Rica (2003) - Venevisión
 El amor las vuelve locas (2005) - Venevisión
 Ciudad Bendita (2006) - Venevisión
 Toda una dama (2008) Imperio Laya - RCTV Internacional
 Tomasa Tequiero (2009) - Venevisión
 El árbol de Gabriel (2011) - Venevisión
 De todas maneras Rosa (2013) - Venevisión
 Entre tu amor y mi amor (2016)

References

External links
 

Living people
1963 births
Venezuelan telenovela actresses
People from Caracas